Isla or ISLA may refer to:

Organizations
 International Securities Lending Association, a trade association
 International School of Los Angeles
 International Bilingual School, later named International School of Los Angeles

People
 Isla (given name)
 Víctor Isla, Peruvian politician and a Congressman representing Loreto for the 2006–2011 term
 Mauricio Isla, Chilean football player

Music 
 Isla (Portico Quartet album), a 2009 album by Portico Quartet

Places
Isla, Queensland, a locality in the Shire of Banana, Australia
 Mt. Izla, location of ancient Christian monasteries, on the border between Turkey and Syria
 Isla (Cantabria), a village in the Spanish region of Cantabria
 River Isla, Perthshire, a tributary of the River Tay in Perthshire, Scotland; flows through Glen Isla and Strathmore
 River Isla, Moray a tributary of the River Deveron in North-East Scotland; flows through Keith in Banffshire 
 Senglea, Isla (Senglea), a fortified city in the east of Malta, mainly in the Grand Harbour area
 Isla, Texas, an unincorporated community in the United States
 Isla, Valenzuela, a settlement in the Philippines
 Isla, Veracruz, a town in Mexico
 Isla, a village in Hodoșa Commune, Mureș County, Romania

See also

 
 
 ILAS (disambiguation)
 Island (disambiguation)
 Isle (disambiguation)
 Ila (disambiguation)
 Ile (disambiguation)